Sir John Guise, 2nd Baronet (c.1654 – November 1695) of Elmore Court, Gloucestershire was an English landowner and Member of Parliament.

Life
He was born the only son of Sir Christopher Guise, 1st Baronet of the Elmore baronets of Gloucestershire and educated at Christ Church, Oxford, where he matriculated in 1669. He then travelled in France for a while. He succeeded his father to the baronetcy and to Elmore Court in 1670.

He acted as a local Justice of the Peace and as a Deputy-Lieutenant of Gloucestershire (?1674-81, 1689-death). He was Mayor of Gloucester for 1690–91 and Vice-Admiral of Gloucestershire from 1691 to his death.

He was elected the Member of Parliament for Gloucestershire in February 1679, August 1679 and 1681 but defeated in the election of 1685 by the Court party candidate and forced to take refuge in the Netherlands. He returned in 1688 with William of Orange and then took part in the capture of Bristol as Colonel of a foot regiment. Re-elected for Gloucestershire to the Convention Parliament of 1689 he was an active member, serving on many committees. Re-elected again in 1690 and 1695 he died in office shortly after his final election.

Private life
He died of smallpox in November 1695 and was buried in St John the Baptist church, Elmore. He had married, in 1674, Elizabeth, the daughter of John Grobham Howe of Little Compton, Withington, Gloucestershire, a previous MP for the county. He and Elizabeth had a son and 2 daughters. He was succeeded by his son John.

References

1650s births
1695 deaths
Baronets in the Baronetage of England
Mayors of Gloucester
Deputy Lieutenants of Gloucestershire
English MPs 1679
English MPs 1680–1681
English MPs 1681
English MPs 1689–1690
English MPs 1690–1695
English MPs 1695–1698
Deaths from smallpox